Panjab University Swami Sarvanand Giri Regional Centre (PUSSGRC) in Hoshiarpur, is an integral part of Panjab University, Chandigarh.

Panjab University was established in 1882 at Lahore (now in Pakistani Punjab). It has 188 affiliated colleges spread over Punjab, Haryana, Himachal Pradesh, Chandigarh and regional centers at Muktsar, Ludhiana and Hoshiarpur. The University has 75 teaching and research departments and 15 centers/chairs. The campus has classrooms, laboratories and workshops for teaching students. It is furnished with a library, dispensary, canteen and hostel facility for over 600 students.

History 
Dr Lajpat Rai Munger, a US citizen and the owner of the world's largest blueberry farms, who originally belonged to the village of Nangal Shahidan Hoshiarpur, adopted Swami Sarvanand Giri Maharaj as his guru. He bought 20 acres of property in the name of his guruji in Bajwara village and constructed a campus. Later, he donated it to Panjab University. In February 2006, the campus became the Regional Centre of Panjab University.

Departments

University Institute of Engineering & Technology (UIET Hoshiarpur) 
The Engineering department of PUSSGRC combines several technical streams, enrolling more than 1000 students. It encompasses a Computer Science and Engineering department, an Electronics and Communication department, a Mechanical Engineering department  and an Information Technology department. Degrees include:
 B.E. Electronics and Communications Engineering
 B.E. Computer Science and Engineering
 B.E. Mechanical Engineering
 B.E. Information technology (started w.e.f. session 2011–12)

Department of Computer Science & Applications (DCSA) 
PUSSGRC offers a three year, full-time Master of Computer Applications degree.   The course covers various aspects of computational theory, programming, algorithm design and optimization, work and data-base management, mobile technologies, mathematics, probability, statistics, accounting, finance etc. 

DCSA Deptt. also offers 1 year Post Graduate Diploma in Computer Applications (PGDCA).

University Institute of Legal Studies (UILS) 
PUSSGRC provides education in Indian law. UILS Department offers 3 years LLB & 5 years integrated BA-LLB programme.

It also offers 1 year LLM program. (started w.e.f. session 2020-21)

Admissions 
Admission is on the basis of JEE-Mains (formerly AIEEE). Candidates apply for JAC, Chandigarh.  The candidates having compartment in 10+2 examination held in the current year are not eligible for admission. MCA and LLB/B.A.LL.B admissions are through the PU CET test merits.

Collaboration 
 Texas Instruments - Provide assistance in terms of training and equipment for embedded systems.
 INFOSYS - Develop programming skills of promising programmers.
 IBM - IBM center of excellence conducts workshops, evaluation and technology sharing.

Training and Placement Cell 
PUSSGRC has a training and placement program headed by Rajeev Dang (ME, LLB, MBA). The program operates training and placement activities that are undertaken by teacher and student coordinators under the guidance of Dr. Satish Kumar. Students from all departments are selected through personal interviews conducted by the faculty members of the cell. Besides opening job avenues for the students, the cell ensures that students are well equipped to meet the requirements of the industry. Students have found posts in firms such as Birlasoft, Infosys, Accenture, Igate Patni, Quark, Dell, Infogain, Nucleus Software, Wipro, Ambuja Cement, IBM, Mahindra & Mahindra, Sml Isuzu, Sonalika International Tractors etc.

MANTHAN-2013 
The first annual HR meet of was organized by the Training and placement cell on 13 April 2013. Prof. Naval Kishore (Dean, College Development Council, Panjab University, Chandigarh), Mr. R. L. Kapoor (Advisor & Secretary to the Vice-Chancellor, Panjab University, Chandigarh), Prof. S. K. Chadha (Director, Central Placement Cell, Panjab University, Chandigarh), Mr. Amandeep Singh Marwaha (Training & Placement Officer, UIAMS, Panjab University, Chandigarh) all attended. Two interactive panel discussions took place, titled "Meeting Industry Deficit with Empowered Youth" and "Understanding Upcoming Industry Trends".

Student Welfare Society 
The Students Welfare Society (SWS) is headed by Dr. Virender Negi (Student Welfare Incharge) who holds responsibility for various extra-curricular and cultural activities in the campus. SWS organized events such as guest lectures, sports meets, annual festival, etc. Successful events included AAROHAN 2009, AAROHAN 2010, ANANT 2011, ANANT 2012 and ANANT 2K13.

Chief Justice visit 
Chief Justice of India (CJI) Altamas Kabir visited the school to talk about illegal immigration and fraudulent marriages involving NRIs. Supreme Court Judge and Executive Chairman of the National Legal Services Authority Justice D K Jain presided and Punjab and Haryana High Court Chief Justice A K Sikri, the patron-in-chief of the PLSA, participated.

ANANT 
ANANT is the annual techno-cultural fest. The 2K13 edition was held on 4–6 April 2013 on the theme "Green Earth".  The working body planned to highlight technical research and development, cultural awakening and spread the word of a clean and green environment. MP Sh. Avinash Rai Khanna and Prof Renu Vig (Director, UIET Chandigarh) on Digital Image Processing presented. The 3-day experience included technical events such as Robo Soccer, Mud Rally, Line Sychophant, Circuit King, Robo Wars, Electrical Junkyard, Code Caffeine etc., literary events such as Braniac, Symposium-the group discussion, Promethean fantasy-the picture declamation, Spur of the moment. All these events were aimed at strengthening the cultural and literary aspects and giving the students a platform to explore the horizons of these fields.

Cultural events included Cotillion - a dance competition and A-la-mode - a fashion show. The last day was marked by a lecture on "Right to information" by Prof GK Chattrath. It drew students from other colleges as well. Star night featured Punjabi singer Geeta Zaildar.

Clubs and societies 
 Zamaana- Photography Club
 TECHNNOVATION Techfest 2019
 SHOR- The official theater group of PUSSGRC 
 D Cult (dance club)
 Symphonic Vibrations (official musical group)
 Yantrix (technical club)
 Literati- The Literary Club
 National Cadet Corps "Army Wing"(Under 12 PB BN NCC, Hoshiarpur)
 Sports & Cultural Club
 Friends Welfare Society (registered NGO of PUSSGRC)
 PUSSGRC-SAE India Collegiate Club
 Hoshiarpur Mozilla Campus Club
 Ecell UIETH (Entrepreneurship Cell)
 Platform Tech Group (Techno-managerial society)

Magazine 
PRATIBIMB (Reflection) is the first official magazine of PUSSGRC, Hoshiarpur. The magazine is meant to reflect the achievements and talents of PUSSGRC. It is an initiative to highlight the creativity and the potential of students, showing students' creative side. It is a medium to unite the students of the departments (Engineering, Law, and MCA) to work as a team.

ALUMNI

• Flight Lieutenant Hina Jaiswal (First Indian Woman Flight Engineer) | Commissioned into Indian Air Force (IAF) Engineering Wing in 2015. 

• Er. Priyanka Srivastava {EC Batch of 2014} (Space Systems Engineer at NASA Jet Propulsion Laboratory, Pasadena, California)

• Gulshan Sharma {Mech. Engg. Batch of 2013} (Founder & MD of Falahari- A Fruitful Habit) | Featured in FORBES - 30 Under 30 - Asia - The Arts 2020

References

External links 
 
 Technical Club Website
 Annual Techno-Cultural Fest ANANT-2K13

Hoshiarpur
Panjab University
2006 establishments in Punjab, India
Educational institutions established in 2006